Kay Amert (November 11, 1947–September 5, 2008) was an American scholar of French Renaissance printing and a typographer and letterpress printer. She was the director of the University of Iowa Typography Library from 1972 to 2006 where she was a professor in the School of Journalism and Mass Communication.

Life and career
Kay Amert was born on November 11, 1947, in Madison, South Dakota. Amert attended the University of Iowa in 1966 where she created her own private press imprint, the Seamark Press. Its first book was Holding Action, a compilation of poems by Sam Hamond which was published in 1969. Seamark press published thirteen more books containing work of American poets over the next sixteen years. She was the director of the University of Iowa Typography Library from 1972 to 2006 where she was also a professor in the School of Journalism and Mass Communication. Amert received the Collegiate Teaching Award. She died of cancer on September 5, 2008. Robert Bringhurst edited her research into a book The Scythe and the Rabbit: Simon de Colines and the Culture of the Book in Renaissance Paris which was published posthumously in 2012.

References

External links
 Kay Amert research papers, Vault MSS 6804, L. Tom Perry Special Collections, Harold B. Lee Library, Brigham Young University

1947 births
2008 deaths
University of Iowa faculty
American women historians
People from Madison, South Dakota
20th-century American women
20th-century American people
Harold B. Lee Library-related rare books articles
21st-century American women